Mona Charen Parker (born February 25, 1957) is a columnist, journalist, and political commentator in the United States. She has written three books: Useful Idiots: How Liberals Got it Wrong in the Cold War and Still Blame America First (2003), Do-Gooders: How Liberals Hurt Those They Claim to Help (and the Rest of Us) (2005), both New York Times bestsellers, and Sex Matters: How Modern Feminism Lost Touch with Science, Love, and Common Sense (2018). She was also a weekly panelist on CNN's Capital Gang until it was canceled. A political conservative, she often writes about foreign policy, terrorism, politics, poverty, family structure, public morality, and culture. She is also known for her generally pro-Israel views.

Early life and education
Charen was born in New York City and raised in Livingston, New Jersey, where she went to school with fellow journalist Ruth Marcus, starting "in fourth grade." She is Jewish. She received her B.A. degree with honors from Barnard College of Columbia University in 1979 and a J.D. degree from George Washington University Law School in 1984.

Career

Charen wrote for National Review magazine, where she was an editorial assistant starting in 1979. Later she joined the staff of First Lady Nancy Reagan as a speechwriter. She then worked on President Ronald Reagan's staff, in the White House Office of Public Liaison and in the Office of Communications.

Charen served as Jack Kemp's speechwriter in his unsuccessful 1988 presidential bid. She launched her syndicated column in 1987. It is syndicated by Creators Syndicate and has been featured in more than 200 papers, including the Boston Globe, Baltimore Sun, St. Louis Post-Dispatch, Atlanta Journal-Constitution, and Washington Times.

Charen was a regular weekly commentator on CNN's The Capital Gang, which appeared on Saturdays. Following an on-air heated exchange with fellow panelist Al Hunt, the two of them did not appear on the same panel for several weeks. Charen switched to Capital Gang Sunday when that program was launched, appearing until the program was canceled.

Her columns have also appeared online at National Review Online, TownHall.com, and the e-zine Jewish World Review.

In 2010, Charen won the Eric Breindel Journalism Award. Currently, she appears regularly on John Batchelor's radio show.

In June 2014, she became a senior fellow at the Ethics and Public Policy Center.

In February 2018 she was invited to participate in a CPAC panel discussion. Her comments, which elicited boos and jeers from the audience, included the following:I am disappointed in people on our side for being hypocrites about sexual harassers and abusers of women, who are in our party, who are sitting in the White House, who brag about their extramarital affairs, who brag about mistreating women—and because he happens to have an 'R' after his name we look the other way ... This is a party that endorsed Roy Moore for the Senate in the state of Alabama even though he was a credibly accused child molester. You cannot claim that you stand for women and put up with that ... Speaking of bad guys, there was quite an interesting person who was on this stage the other day. Her name is Marion Le Pen. Now, why was she here? Why was she here? She's a young, no-longer-in-office politician from France. I think the only reason she was here is because she's named Le Pen. And the Le Pen name is a disgrace. Her grandfather is a racist and a Nazi. She claims that she stands for him. And the fact that CPAC invited her is a disgrace.

Charen subsequently wrote a New York Times op-ed entitled "I'm Glad I Got Booed at CPAC".

Charen is also currently Policy Editor of The Bulwark website and host of the Beg to Differ podcast there.

Personal life
Charen is married to Robert P. Parker, a Washington, D.C. lawyer. They have three sons.

Bibliography

See also
2017–18 United States political sexual scandals
Donald Trump sexual misconduct allegations

References

External links
 
 
 Podcasts of Charen's recent articles
 Mona Charen Features at Creators Syndicate
 Need to know
 

1957 births
Living people
21st-century American non-fiction writers
21st-century American women writers
American columnists
American Orthodox Jews
American political commentators
American political writers
American women non-fiction writers
Barnard College alumni
CNN people
Ethics and Public Policy Center
Female critics of feminism
Jewish American writers
Journalists from New Jersey
George Washington University Law School alumni
National Review people
People from Livingston, New Jersey
American women columnists
Women political writers
Writers from New Jersey